Munish may refer to:

 Munish Arora (born 1971), Indian-born Singaporean cricketer
 Munish Jolly (born 1974), Indian former cricketer
 Munish Makhija (born 1968), Indian video jockey
 Munish Chander Puri (1939–2005), former Professor Emeritus of Mathematics at IIT Delhi

Indian masculine given names